Rowhani Saffron Co., (Persian زعفران روحانی ) a company of wholesale and export Iranian saffron based in Mashhad Iran. The main activities of this company are conventional and organic saffron cultivation, packaging Saffron and export saffron to other countries.

History 

90 - 93% of Saffron in world produced in Iran Khorasan provinces. Mashhad, capital of Khorasan province, the center of activity is the export of saffron and most saffron companies are in Mashhad. Saffron with scientific name Crocus sativus are an expensive spice and on several occasions it used to be In cooking, perfumes, industrial, health and medicine, cosmetic.

Rowhani Saffron established in 2009 by Mr.Rowhani in Mashhad, Iran. this company before established worked inside Iran and distribution Products to other city in Iran and from 2009 began to legally export of saffron. Products of this company in large and small packed offered. after Iran sanctions this company had problems for make deal to other customers and export saffron through private courier.

Iran sanctions 

After the intensification of sanctions against Iran, Rowhani Saffron Co., like other Iranian companies was faced with many problems. These problems include the rising cost of raw materials, international transportation problems and difficulties of the international banking sanctions was. However, Mr.Rowhani said, Rowhani Saffron Co. every month more than 50 kilograms of packaged saffron exports to other countries.
Rowhani Saffron have new plan for America markets and Europe markets after Iran Deal. They are preparing for new packaging and received the ISO after the remove of sanctions. CEO of Rowhani Saffron Co. Said "We have a new plan for Europe and U.S. markets. We are designing new packaging and I will get new certificates -- such as the ISO 9001 (quality management system) -- to assure our customers."  Now most their export are to UAE and India.

References

External links
 Official website

Food and drink companies of Iran
Food and drink companies established in 2009
2009 establishments in Iran
Privately held companies of Iran
Iranian brands
Mashhad
Saffron